The Higher Colleges of Technology (HCT) is a public institute of technology with campuses and facilities throughout the United Arab Emirates. Founded in 1988 by Sheikh Nahyan bin Mubarak al-Nahyan, it is the largest applied higher educational institution in the country. 

During the 2019–2020 academic year, there were 14,246 female and 6,744 male students enrolled at 16 campuses and six academic divisions throughout the country. More than 67,000 UAE nationals are graduates of the institution.

The HCT has formal alliances with a number of international tertiary education and training institutions, and corporate partnerships with local and multinational companies. Some programs have international accreditation: for example, the HCT's Bachelor of Education degree was developed with, and is certified by the University of Melbourne.

The CERT (Centre of Excellence for Applied Research and Training) is the commercial arm of the Higher Colleges of Technology, developing and providing education, training and applied technology for public and private sector clients, since 1996.

The HCT Chancellor is H.E. Nasser Bin Thani Juma Al Hamli, UAE Minister of Human Resources & Emiratization. Dr Tayeb A. Kamali was appointed as the Vice Chancellor in June 2005. Mohammed Omran Al Shamsi was made President of the Higher Colleges in 2013, an appointment that carried Ministerial rank.  On March 17, 2015 Abdullatif M. Al Shamsi was appointed as HCT Vice Chancellor, by Federal Decree. He is now the President & CEO of HCT.

History 

In 1985, H.E. Sheikh Nahayan Mabarak Al Nahayan, Chancellor of the United Arab Emirates University, made a commitment to establish a new system of post-secondary education for UAE Nationals that would stress the ideals of productivity, self-determination, and excellence.

In 1988, Federal Law No 2 established the Higher Colleges of Technology (HCT).

Campuses

Ras Al Khaimah Women's campus 
Ras Al Khaimah Women's campus (RKW) has over 1800 students and offers a wide variety of business and technical courses for Emirati women in Ras Al Khaimah.

The HCT-Sharjah Men's and Women's campuses
The HCT-Sharjah campuses are two of the 16 colleges that compose the Higher Colleges of Technology (HCT) in the United Arab Emirates (UAE). The Sharjah Women's campus (SJW) was established in 1997 and the Sharjah Men's campus (SJM) in 1998.

The current Executive Director of the Sharjah campuses is Yahya Al Ansaari.

Madinat Zayed and Ruwais campuses 
New campuses were opened in 2007 for both men and women in the Al Dhafrah region of the Abu Dhabi Emirate in the cities of Madinat Zayed and Ruwais. The current Executive Director of the Madinat Zayed and Ruwais campuses is Addel Al Ameri.

Initiatives 

 It created a 3D Printed Ventilator Splitter for treating multiple patients with a single ventilator in hospitals’ Intensive Care Units.
 It launched the UAE’s first Artificial Intelligence Academy, with the National Program for Artificial intelligence.
 It became the UAE’s first approved university economic free zone with the inauguration of the HCT InnCuVation Spaces.
 Agreed with the Ministry of Human Resources and Emiratization (MOHRE) to provide training and upskilling for 18,000 Emirati students through the National Training Program.
 It became the UAE’s first government higher education institution to obtain 100% accreditation of its academic programs, through the UAE's Commission for Academic Accreditation (CAA).

Notes

References 

Education in the United Arab Emirates
Universities and colleges in the United Arab Emirates
Educational institutions established in 1988
Science and technology in the United Arab Emirates
Technical universities and colleges in the United Arab Emirates
1988 establishments in the United Arab Emirates